Xbills Ebenezer (born  Annor Ebenezer) is a Ghanaian music video director, and filmmaker. He is the founder and CEO of Xpress Philms, a production company that specialises in production of film, television, and music video. Xbills has directed music videos for recording artists across an array of genres, including Bisa Kdei, Shatta Wale, Becca, Kofi Kinaata, Edem, Eazzy, Gurunkz,VVIP, Obrafour, Dobble, AK Songstress, Tic Tac, Sarkodie, Jupiter,and more.

Life and career 
Ebenezxar was born to Miss Juliet Gladys Osafo and Mr Fred K. Annor on 17 April 1987, in a town called Kukurantumi-Akim in the Eastern Region of Ghana and his early days in school began at Asafo-Akim and later on headed to the Ofori Panin Senior High School where he studied Visual Arts. At Ofori Panin Senior High School, Xbills Ebenezer won the Best Visual Arts student in his class for a couple of times. He is the fifth born of his parents among six children, hence, the rod was never spared anytime he flawed. Inspired by the colorful and artistic nature of the Michael Jackson culture during his high school days, he began singing to beats and miming to songs as well as dreaming to create fictional movies in the future which could be as wild as, and more horrible than those of Michael Jackson. Sometimes at his young age, he would sketch his movies on a piece of paper in pictorial form and anyone who read it understood it perfectly from beginning to end with equally good literary elements in them. He started full-time music video production in 1997 and his breakthrough video was Gurunkz "Lapaz Toyota" which was shot in 2011.

Music videos directed
This is a list of music videos directed by Xbills Ebenezer. 37 music videos are currently listed here.

References

External links
 
 
  at Fruttiboxx Africa.
 Fimfim ft Kesse rapperman

Living people
1987 births
Ghanaian music video directors